Iván Álvarez (born 18 December 1981) is a Spanish cyclist. He competed in the men's cross-country mountain biking event at the 2004 Summer Olympics.

References

1981 births
Living people
Spanish male cyclists
Olympic cyclists of Spain
Cyclists at the 2004 Summer Olympics
Cyclists from Madrid